Allan Charles Cockram (born 8 October 1963) is an English retired professional footballer who played in the Football League for Tottenham Hotspur, Bristol Rovers, Brentford and Reading as a midfielder or winger. He later player-managed St Albans City and Chertsey Town in non-League football. Cockram is currently manager of Cambridge University.

Playing career

A winger, Cockram joined Tottenham Hotspur as a schoolboy in 1975 and went on to make two first team appearances for the Lilywhites towards the end of the 1983–84 season. He was released at the end of the 1984–85 season and a two-year period followed as a football nomad, which included short periods playing for Bristol Rovers and Farnborough Town and two spells in the United States. A move to Isthmian League Premier Division club St Albans City during the latter part of the 1986–87 season, in a bid to return to fitness following an achilles injury, proved to be the turning point in Cockram's career. He was voted the Saints' Player of the Year at the end of the 1987–88 season.

After a successful period training full-time with Brentford during the 1987–88 season, Cockram signed a contract with the club in March 1988. He made 118 appearances and scored 17 goals for the club before his release at the end of the 1990–91 season. After a spell back in non-League football with Woking, Cockram made a return to the Football League with Reading in October 1991 and rejoined St Albans City prior to the beginning of the 1992–93 season. He remained at Clarence Park until the end of 1995–96 season and scored 73 goals in 211 appearances across his six seasons with the club. Cockram finished his career with spells at non-League clubs Chertsey Town and Leatherhead.

Managerial and coaching career 
Cockram player-managed non-League clubs St Albans City and Chertsey Town. He was later a technical specialist at Philadelphia Union and coached at University College London. In 2017, Cockram established Brentford Penguins, a Down Syndrome football club. In 2019, he became manager of Cambridge University.

International career 
Cockram represented England Youth.

Personal life
Cockram worked as a firefighter in west London and later became a businessman.

Career statistics

Honours 
St Albans City
 Herts Charity Cup: 1986–87

Individual

 St Albans City Player of the Year: 1987–88

References

External links
Cocker's Chronicles – SKD AND THE LOST BOYS

1963 births
Living people
Footballers from Kensington
English footballers
English Football League players
Tottenham Hotspur F.C. players
Bristol Rovers F.C. players
St Albans City F.C. players
Brentford F.C. players
Woking F.C. players
Reading F.C. players
St Albans City F.C. managers
Isthmian League players
English expatriates in the United States
Expatriate soccer players in the United States
Chertsey Town F.C. players
Leatherhead F.C. players
English football managers
Isthmian League managers
England youth international footballers
Farnborough F.C. players
Philadelphia Union non-playing staff
Association football midfielders
Association football wingers